Untied is the third studio album from Australian vocal group The Ten Tenors, released in Australia in 2000. The album was released in Europe in 2002 under the title One Is Not Enough.

Track listing

 European bonus tracks recorded in Berlin on 30/31 August 2002.

Charts

Release history

References

2000 albums
The Ten Tenors albums